Edayillam Chandrasekharan (born 26 December 1948) is an Indian politician from Kasaragod, and is the former Revenue Minister of Kerala in the Pinarayi Vijayan Ministry.

He is the son of P. Kunhiraman Nair and Edayillam Parvathi Amma; born at Perumbala on 26 December 1948.

He is presently representing Kanhangad assembly constituency since 2011 Additionally, Member, C.P.I., State Secretariat (Since 2005) Communist Party of India (CPI).

Positions held
Taluk Secretary, A.I.Y.F., Kasaragod (1970)
District Secretary, A.I.Y.F., Kannur (1975)
Member, CPI, State Council (1976)
State Joint Secretary, A.I.Y.F. (1979)
Member, C.P.I., Kasaragod Taluk Committee
District Secretariat Member Kannur
Member, Chemmanadu Grama Panchayat (1979–84)
Assistant District Secretary, C.P.I., Kasaragod (1984)
District Secretary, C.P.I. (1987)
State Executive Member, C.P.I. (1998)
Member, Kerala State Village Development Board (1987–91)
Director Board Member, Kerala Agro Machineries Corporation  (1991–96)
Member, State Land Reforms Review Committee (2008-2010)

References

External links

 Chandrashekharan MLA

1948 births
Living people
Communist Party of India politicians from Kerala
People from Kasaragod district
Kerala MLAs 2016–2021